The 1990 Pittsburgh Pirates season was their 109th season; the 104th in the National League. This was their 21st season at Three Rivers Stadium. The Pirates finished first in the National League East with a record of 95–67. They were defeated four games to two by the Cincinnati Reds in the 1990 National League Championship Series.

Offseason
 December 4, 1989: Gordon Dillard was drafted by the Pirates from the Philadelphia Phillies in the 1989 rule 5 draft.
 January 14, 1990: Mark Ross was signed as a free agent by the Pirates.
 January 31, 1990: Wally Backman was signed as a free agent by the Pirates.

Regular season
 Barry Bonds became the first Major Leaguer in history to have a .300 batting average, 100 RBI, 100 runs and 50 stolen bases in the same season.  With 33 home runs, he became the second to have 30 home runs and 50 steals in a season, following Cincinnati's Eric Davis in 1987.

Season standings

Game log

|- bgcolor="ccffcc"
| 1 || April 9 || @ Mets || 12–3 || Drabek || Gooden || — || 47,919 || 1–0
|- bgcolor="ffbbbb"
| 2 || April 11 || @ Mets || 0–3 || Viola || Smiley || Franco || 16,880 || 1–1
|- bgcolor="ccffcc"
| 3 || April 12 || @ Mets || 6–2 || Heaton || Fernandez || — || 16,544 || 2–1
|- bgcolor="ffbbbb"
| 4 || April 13 || Cubs || 0–2 || Maddux || Walk || Williams || 44,799 || 2–2
|- bgcolor="ffbbbb"
| 5 || April 14 || Cubs || 1–4 || Harkey || Drabek || Williams || 13,226 || 2–3
|- bgcolor="ccffcc"
| 6 || April 15 || Cubs || 4–3 (10) || Patterson || Lancaster || — || 6,289 || 3–3
|- bgcolor="ffbbbb"
| 7 || April 16 || Cardinals || 4–6 || DeLeon || Smiley || Horton || 7,136 || 3–4
|- bgcolor="ccffcc"
| 8 || April 17 || Cardinals || 7–2 || Heaton || Mathews || — || 3,981 || 4–4
|- bgcolor="ffbbbb"
| 9 || April 18 || Cardinals || 0–3 || Tudor || Walk || Dayley || 11,626 || 4–5
|- bgcolor="ccffcc"
| 10 || April 19 || @ Cardinals || 5–1 || Drabek || Magrane || — || 20,495 || 5–5
|- bgcolor="ccffcc"
| 11 || April 20 || @ Cubs || 9–4 (7) || Roesler || Bielecki || — || 15,171 || 6–5
|- bgcolor="ccffcc"
| 12 || April 21 || @ Cubs || 4–3 || Smiley || Wilson || Landrum || 37,091 || 7–5
|- bgcolor="ccffcc"
| 13 || April 22 || @ Cubs || 3–2 || Heaton || Nunez || Power || 33,583 || 8–5
|- bgcolor="ffbbbb"
| 14 || April 23 || @ Cardinals || 4–7 || Tudor || Walk || — || 22,748 || 8–6
|- bgcolor="ccffcc"
| 15 || April 24 || @ Giants || 4–1 || Drabek || Garrelts || Landrum || 10,881 || 9–6
|- bgcolor="ccffcc"
| 16 || April 25 || @ Giants || 7–4 (12) || Patterson || Bedrosian || — || 10,698 || 10–6
|- bgcolor="ccffcc"
| 17 || April 26 || @ Giants || 2–1 || Smiley || LaCoss || — || 10,493 || 11–6
|- bgcolor="ccffcc"
| 18 || April 27 || @ Padres || 9–4 || Heaton || Show || — || 23,376 || 12–6
|- bgcolor="ccffcc"
| 19 || April 28 || @ Padres || 4–3 || Walk || Benes || Landrum || 26,473 || 13–6
|- bgcolor="ccffcc"
| 20 || April 29 || @ Padres || 10–1 || Drabek || Rasmussen || — || 27,206 || 14–6
|-

|- bgcolor="ffbbbb"
| 21 || May 1 || @ Dodgers || 1–4 || Belcher || Terrell || — || 31,292 || 14–7
|- bgcolor="ffbbbb"
| 22 || May 2 || @ Dodgers || 2–6 || Valenzuela || Smiley || — || 32,089 || 14–8
|- bgcolor="ccffcc"
| 23 || May 6 || Braves || 6–4 || Heaton || Smoltz || Ruskin ||  || 15–8
|- bgcolor="ccffcc"
| 24 || May 6 || Braves || 4–2 || Drabek || Lilliquist || Patterson || 17,108 || 16–8
|- bgcolor="ccffcc"
| 25 || May 7 || Padres || 4–1 || Walk || Hurst || Power || 9,653 || 17–8
|- bgcolor="ccffcc"
| 26 || May 8 || Padres || 10–2 || Terrell || Show || — || 10,694 || 18–8
|- bgcolor="ccffcc"
| 27 || May 9 || Reds || 6–2 || Smiley || Armstrong || Landrum || 17,149 || 19–8
|- bgcolor="ffbbbb"
| 28 || May 10 || Reds || 4–10 || Charlton || Power || — || 15,071 || 19–9
|- bgcolor="ccffcc"
| 29 || May 11 || Astros || 4–3 || Drabek || Deshaies || Landrum || 24,734 || 20–9
|- bgcolor="ccffcc"
| 30 || May 12 || Astros || 3–1 || Heaton || Portugal || Power || 16,066 || 21–9
|- bgcolor="ccffcc"
| 31 || May 13 || Astros || 5–1 || Walk || Gullickson || Landrum || 16,658 || 22–9
|- bgcolor="ffbbbb"
| 32 || May 14 || @ Reds || 3–5 || Armstrong || Terrell || Myers || 24,211 || 22–10
|- bgcolor="ffbbbb"
| 33 || May 15 || @ Reds || 4–5 (11) || Layana || Patterson || — || 13,353 || 22–11
|- bgcolor="ffbbbb"
| 34 || May 17 || @ Braves || 1–6 || Lilliquist || Heaton || Hesketh || 6,340 || 22–12
|- bgcolor="ccffcc"
| 35 || May 18 || @ Braves || 9–3 || Walk || Clary || — || 19,001 || 23–12
|- bgcolor="ffbbbb"
| 36 || May 19 || @ Braves || 1–2 || Glavine || Terrell || Hesketh || 26,170 || 23–13
|- bgcolor="ffbbbb"
| 37 || May 20 || @ Braves || 11–13 || Smith || Kipper || Boever || 8,288 || 23–14
|- bgcolor="ffbbbb"
| 38 || May 21 || @ Astros || 2–3 (11) || Agosto || Power || — || 8,116 || 23–15
|- bgcolor="ccffcc"
| 39 || May 22 || @ Astros || 8–4 || Heaton || Schatzeder || — || 8,661 || 24–15
|- bgcolor="ffbbbb"
| 40 || May 23 || @ Astros || 3–7 || Agosto || Ruskin || — || 10,961 || 24–16
|- bgcolor="ffbbbb"
| 41 || May 25 || Giants || 8–9 || Burkett || Terrell || Brantley || 24,644 || 24–17
|- bgcolor="ccffcc"
| 42 || May 26 || Giants || 10–4 || Drabek || Garrelts || — || 25,150 || 25–17
|- bgcolor="ccffcc"
| 43 || May 27 || Giants || 5–2 || Heaton || Reuschel || Power || 23,943 || 26–17
|- bgcolor="ccffcc"
| 44 || May 28 || Dodgers || 6–5 || Landrum || Howell || — || 26,171 || 27–17
|- bgcolor="ccffcc"
| 45 || May 29 || Dodgers || 9–5 || Patterson || Valenzuela || Ruskin || 10,252 || 28–17
|- bgcolor="ccffcc"
| 46 || May 30 || Dodgers || 5–3 || Terrell || Martinez || Landrum || 22,198 || 29–17
|-

|- bgcolor="ffbbbb"
| 47 || June 1 || Expos || 1–4 || Gross || Drabek || Mohorcic || 27,410 || 29–18
|- bgcolor="ccffcc"
| 48 || June 2 || Expos || 4–3 (10) || Landrum || Hall || — || 47,374 || 30–18
|- bgcolor="ffbbbb"
| 49 || June 3 || Expos || 3–4 || Sampen || Belinda || Schmidt || 27,817 || 30–19
|- bgcolor="ccffcc"
| 50 || June 4 || Cubs || 6–2 || Patterson || Boskie || Landrum || 9,257 || 31–19
|- bgcolor="ccffcc"
| 51 || June 5 || Cubs || 6–5 || Belinda || Williams || — || 20,642 || 32–19
|- bgcolor="ccffcc"
| 52 || June 6 || Cubs || 6–1 (7) || Drabek || Maddux || — || 21,164 || 33–19
|- bgcolor="ccffcc"
| 53 || June 7 || @ Mets || 5–4 || Ruskin || Musselman || Kipper || 28,443 || 34–19
|- bgcolor="ffbbbb"
| 54 || June 8 || @ Mets || 1–7 || Fernandez || Walk || — || 29,710 || 34–20
|- bgcolor="ffbbbb"
| 55 || June 9 || @ Mets || 3–9 || Cone || Patterson || — || 38,379 || 34–21
|- bgcolor="ffbbbb"
| 56 || June 10 || @ Mets || 3–8 || Ojeda || Terrell || — || 46,868 || 34–22
|- bgcolor="ccffcc"
| 57 || June 11 || @ Cardinals || 8–7 || Belinda || Niedenfuer || Landrum || 27,403 || 35–22
|- bgcolor="ccffcc"
| 58 || June 12 || @ Cardinals || 6–3 || Heaton || DeLeon || Landrum || 30,815 || 36–22
|- bgcolor="ccffcc"
| 59 || June 13 || @ Cardinals || 6–5 || Huismann || DiPino || Reed || 26,926 || 37–22
|- bgcolor="ffbbbb"
| 60 || June 15 || Mets || 5–7 || Ojeda || Terrell || Franco || 35,935 || 37–23
|- bgcolor="ccffcc"
| 61 || June 16 || Mets || 11–6 || Kipper || Viola || — || 43,653 || 38–23
|- bgcolor="ffbbbb"
| 62 || June 17 || Mets || 3–4 || Gooden || Heaton || Franco || 35,652 || 38–24
|- bgcolor="ffbbbb"
| 63 || June 19 || @ Phillies || 1–2 (10) || Carman || Landrum || — || 29,781 || 38–25
|- bgcolor="ffbbbb"
| 64 || June 20 || @ Phillies || 2–7 || Ruffin || Patterson || — || 40,256 || 38–26
|- bgcolor="ffbbbb"
| 65 || June 22 || @ Expos || 3–4 || Sampen || Belinda || Schmidt || 22,968 || 38–27
|- bgcolor="ffbbbb"
| 66 || June 23 || @ Expos || 1–6 || Smith || Drabek || — || 27,605 || 38–28
|- bgcolor="ccffcc"
| 67 || June 24 || @ Expos || 5–3 || Heaton || Martinez || Belinda || 41,054 || 39–28
|- bgcolor="ccffcc"
| 68 || June 25 || Phillies || 5–0 || Reed || de Jesus || — || 29,369 || 40–28
|- bgcolor="ccffcc"
| 69 || June 26 || Phillies || 1–0 || Ruskin || Ruffin || Belinda || 25,807 || 41–28
|- bgcolor="ccffcc"
| 70 || June 27 || Phillies || 5–3 || Kipper || Howell || Landrum || 40,207 || 42–28
|- bgcolor="ffbbbb"
| 71 || June 28 || @ Cardinals || 1–5 || Tewksbury || Drabek || Smith || 22,602 || 42–29
|- bgcolor="ffbbbb"
| 72 || June 29 || @ Giants || 3–7 || Wilson || Heaton || Brantley || 21,231 || 42–30
|- bgcolor="ccffcc"
| 73 || June 30 || @ Giants || 4–3 || Kipper || Thurmond || Belinda || 31,159 || 43–30
|-

|- bgcolor="ccffcc"
| 74 || July 1 || @ Giants || 8–5 || Tibbs || Oliveras || Landrum || 36,441 || 44–30
|- bgcolor="ccffcc"
| 75 || July 2 || @ Padres || 4–3 (14) || Patterson || Schiraldi || — || 13,842 || 45–30
|- bgcolor="ccffcc"
| 76 || July 3 || @ Padres || 5–3 || Landrum || Lefferts || — || 33,949 || 46–30
|- bgcolor="ffbbbb"
| 77 || July 4 || @ Padres || 4–5 || Show || Heaton || Harris || 10,897 || 46–31
|- bgcolor="ccffcc"
| 78 || July 5 || @ Dodgers || 9–6 || Reed || Martinez || Patterson || 36,231 || 47–31
|- bgcolor="ccffcc"
| 79 || July 6 || @ Dodgers || 6–3 || Smiley || Morgan || — || 33,386 || 48–31
|- bgcolor="ffbbbb"
| 80 || July 7 || @ Dodgers || 2–4 || Belcher || Terrell || — || 38,977 || 48–32
|- bgcolor="ccffcc"
| 81 || July 8 || @ Dodgers || 7–2 || Drabek || Wells || — || 37,271 || 49–32
|- bgcolor="ccffcc"
| 82 || July 12 || Padres || 4–3 (15) || Patterson || Schiraldi || — || 10,960 || 50–32
|- bgcolor="ccffcc"
| 83 || July 13 || Padres || 4–1 || Drabek || Rasmussen || Belinda || 16,108 || 51–32
|- bgcolor="ccffcc"
| 84 || July 14 || Padres || 8–4 || Power || Harris || — || 27,955 || 52–32
|- bgcolor="ffbbbb"
| 85 || July 15 || Padres || 1–4 || Whitson || Heaton || Lefferts || 34,386 || 52–33
|- bgcolor="ffbbbb"
| 86 || July 16 || Giants || 1–6 || Garrelts || Reed || — || 28,304 || 52–34
|- bgcolor="ffbbbb"
| 87 || July 17 || Giants || 3–6 || Robinson || Smiley || — || 23,098 || 52–35
|- bgcolor="ccffcc"
| 88 || July 18 || Giants || 11–2 || Drabek || Wilson || — || 38,430 || 53–35
|- bgcolor="ccffcc"
| 89 || July 20 || Dodgers || 4–2 || Walk || Morgan || Power || 23,198 || 54–35
|- bgcolor="ffbbbb"
| 90 || July 21 || Dodgers || 0–6 || Belcher || Heaton || — || 39,498 || 54–36
|- bgcolor="ccffcc"
| 91 || July 22 || Dodgers || 11–6 || Kipper || Wells || — || 26,818 || 55–36
|- bgcolor="ffbbbb"
| 92 || July 23 || @ Expos || 0–5 || Martinez || Smiley || — || 27,499 || 55–37
|- bgcolor="ccffcc"
| 93 || July 24 || @ Expos || 5–3 || Drabek || Gross || Belinda || 24,444 || 56–37
|- bgcolor="ffbbbb"
| 94 || July 25 || @ Expos || 7–8 (10) || Sampen || Belinda || — || 21,669 || 56–38
|- bgcolor="ffbbbb"
| 95 || July 26 || Phillies || 4–12 || Mulholland || Heaton || — || 24,088 || 56–39
|- bgcolor="ffbbbb"
| 96 || July 27 || Phillies || 3–5 || Cook || Reed || Boever || 29,117 || 56–40
|- bgcolor="ffbbbb"
| 97 || July 28 || Phillies || 3–4 || Parrett || Landrum || Boever || 37,022 || 56–41
|- bgcolor="ccffcc"
| 98 || July 29 || Phillies || 2–1 || Drabek || Combs || — || 33,018 || 57–41
|- bgcolor="ccffcc"
| 99 || July 31 || @ Cubs || 9–1 || Patterson || Boskie || — || 35,126 || 58–41
|-

|- bgcolor="ffbbbb"
| 100 || August 1 || @ Cubs || 0–5 || Maddux || Reed || — || 34,542 || 58–42
|- bgcolor="ccffcc"
| 101 || August 2 || @ Cubs || 8–5 || Smiley || Wilson || Walk || 34,493 || 59–42
|- bgcolor="ccffcc"
| 102 || August 3 || @ Phillies || 11–0 || Drabek || Ruffin || — || 36,057 || 60–42
|- bgcolor="ccffcc"
| 103 || August 4 || @ Phillies || 3–1 (10) || Patterson || McDowell || Power || 45,305 || 61–42
|- bgcolor="ffbbbb"
| 104 || August 5 || @ Phillies || 6–8 || Carman || Ruskin || Boever || 40,142 || 61–43
|- bgcolor="ccffcc"
| 105 || August 6 || @ Phillies || 10–1 || Tomlin || Mulholland || — ||  || 62–43
|- bgcolor="ccffcc"
| 106 || August 6 || @ Phillies || 4–3 (10) || Landrum || McDowell || — || 30,827 || 63–43
|- bgcolor="ccffcc"
| 107 || August 7 || Expos || 4–3 (12) || Ross || Mohorcic || — || 23,666 || 64–43
|- bgcolor="ffbbbb"
| 108 || August 8 || Expos || 2–6 || Martinez || Drabek || — || 21,180 || 64–44
|- bgcolor="ffbbbb"
| 109 || August 9 || Expos || 6–7 (10) || Frey || Landrum || Sampen || 21,499 || 64–45
|- bgcolor="ffbbbb"
| 110 || August 10 || Cardinals || 3–8 || Dayley || Kramer || — || 23,701 || 64–46
|- bgcolor="ffbbbb"
| 111 || August 11 || Cardinals || 2–3 || Magrane || Tomlin || Smith || 46,720 || 64–47
|- bgcolor="ffbbbb"
| 112 || August 12 || Cardinals || 0–6 || Tewksbury || Smiley || — || 30,335 || 64–48
|- bgcolor="ccffcc"
| 113 || August 14 || Braves || 3–1 || Drabek || Leibrandt || — ||  || 65–48
|- bgcolor="ccffcc"
| 114 || August 14 || Braves || 6–4 || Smith || Avery || Patterson || 25,542 || 66–48
|- bgcolor="ffbbbb"
| 115 || August 15 || Braves || 1–8 || Castillo || Heaton || — || 16,063 || 66–49
|- bgcolor="ccffcc"
| 116 || August 16 || Braves || 4–3 || Kipper || Mercker || — || 19,304 || 67–49
|- bgcolor="ccffcc"
| 117 || August 17 || @ Reds || 7–1 || York || Rijo || — ||  || 68–49
|- bgcolor="ccffcc"
| 118 || August 17 || @ Reds || 4–3 || Smiley || Layana || Belinda || 48,964 || 69–49
|- bgcolor="ccffcc"
| 119 || August 18 || @ Reds || 3–1 || Smith || Hammond || Kipper || 35,263 || 70–49
|- bgcolor="ccffcc"
| 120 || August 19 || @ Reds || 6–3 || Drabek || Armstrong || Belinda || 36,549 || 71–49
|- bgcolor="ccffcc"
| 121 || August 20 || Astros || 7–1 || Heaton || Deshaies || — || 20,997 || 72–49
|- bgcolor="ffbbbb"
| 122 || August 21 || Astros || 1–2 || Darwin || Patterson || — || 14,062 || 72–50
|- bgcolor="ccffcc"
| 123 || August 22 || Astros || 4–2 || Smiley || Gullickson || Landrum || 29,420 || 73–50
|- bgcolor="ccffcc"
| 124 || August 23 || Reds || 9–3 || Smith || Hammond || — || 26,181 || 74–50
|- bgcolor="ffbbbb"
| 125 || August 24 || Reds || 3–4 || Dibble || Kipper || Myers || 48,205 || 74–51
|- bgcolor="ffbbbb"
| 126 || August 25 || Reds || 1–6 || Charlton || Belinda || — || 43,679 || 74–52
|- bgcolor="ffbbbb"
| 127 || August 26 || Reds || 2–6 || Mahler || Tomlin || Dibble || 43,174 || 74–53
|- bgcolor="ffbbbb"
| 128 || August 28 || @ Braves || 0–9 || Leibrandt || Smiley || — || 5,872 || 74–54
|- bgcolor="ccffcc"
| 129 || August 29 || @ Braves || 10–0 (7) || Drabek || Avery || — || 5,403 || 75–54
|- bgcolor="ffbbbb"
| 130 || August 31 || @ Astros || 2–3 || Agosto || Patterson || — || 10,892 || 75–55
|-

|- bgcolor="ffbbbb"
| 131 || September 1 || @ Astros || 1–2 (10) || Smith || Power || — || 16,422 || 75–56
|- bgcolor="ccffcc"
| 132 || September 2 || @ Astros || 7–6 || Smiley || Darwin || Kipper || 16,598 || 76–56
|- bgcolor="ccffcc"
| 133 || September 3 || Phillies || 4–1 || Drabek || Ruffin || — || 23,854 || 77–56
|- bgcolor="ccffcc"
| 134 || September 4 || Phillies || 11–7 || Landrum || Akerfelds || Patterson || 16,858 || 78–56
|- bgcolor="ccffcc"
| 135 || September 5 || Mets || 1–0 || Smith || Franco || — ||  || 79–56
|- bgcolor="ccffcc"
| 136 || September 5 || Mets || 3–1 || Heaton || Ojeda || Power || 49,793 || 80–56
|- bgcolor="ccffcc"
| 137 || September 6 || Mets || 7–1 || Tomlin || Valera || — || 32,528 || 81–56
|- bgcolor="ffbbbb"
| 138 || September 7 || Expos || 1–4 || Boyd || Smiley || Burke || 22,083 || 81–57
|- bgcolor="ccffcc"
| 139 || September 8 || Expos || 6–1 || Drabek || Farmer || — || 44,614 || 82–57
|- bgcolor="ffbbbb"
| 140 || September 9 || Expos || 5–9 || Rojas || Walk || — || 22,023 || 82–58
|- bgcolor="ccffcc"
| 141 || September 10 || @ Phillies || 3–2 || Belinda || Boever || — || 18,970 || 83–58
|- bgcolor="ccffcc"
| 142 || September 11 || @ Phillies || 5–1 || Tomlin || Grimsley || — || 20,289 || 84–58
|- bgcolor="ffbbbb"
| 143 || September 12 || @ Mets || 1–2 || Cone || Smiley || — || 48,375 || 84–59
|- bgcolor="ffbbbb"
| 144 || September 13 || @ Mets || 3–6 || Gooden || Drabek || Franco || 51,079 || 84–60
|- bgcolor="ffbbbb"
| 145 || September 14 || @ Expos || 2–4 || Frey || Heaton || — || 15,880 || 84–61
|- bgcolor="ffbbbb"
| 146 || September 15 || @ Expos || 3–4 || Sampen || Smith || Burke || 20,392 || 84–62
|- bgcolor="ffbbbb"
| 147 || September 16 || @ Expos || 1–4 || Ruskin || Tomlin || Frey || 21,286 || 84–63
|- bgcolor="ffbbbb"
| 148 || September 18 || @ Cubs || 5–8 || Maddux || Smiley || — || 23,168 || 84–64
|- bgcolor="ccffcc"
| 149 || September 19 || @ Cubs || 8–7 || Drabek || Sutcliffe || Patterson || 13,058 || 85–64
|- bgcolor="ccffcc"
| 150 || September 20 || @ Cubs || 11–2 || Walk || Kramer || Palacios || 14,926 || 86–64
|- bgcolor="ccffcc"
| 151 || September 21 || Cardinals || 1–0 || Smith || DeLeon || — || 29,048 || 87–64
|- bgcolor="ffbbbb"
| 152 || September 22 || Cardinals || 2–3 || Hill || Tomlin || Smith || 22,895 || 87–65
|- bgcolor="ccffcc"
| 153 || September 23 || Cardinals || 7–2 || Smiley || Tewksbury || Palacios || 30,635 || 88–65
|- bgcolor="ccffcc"
| 154 || September 25 || Cubs || 5–3 || Drabek || Wilson || — || 21,644 || 89–65
|- bgcolor="ccffcc"
| 155 || September 26 || Cubs || 4–3 || Smith || Coffman || — || 26,157 || 90–65
|- bgcolor="ccffcc"
| 156 || September 27 || Cubs || 3–2 || Tomlin || Bielecki || Palacios || 25,049 || 91–65
|- bgcolor="ccffcc"
| 157 || September 28 || @ Cardinals || 6–4 || Landrum || Hill || Belinda || 24,837 || 92–65
|- bgcolor="ccffcc"
| 158 || September 29 || @ Cardinals || 8–0 || Walk || Tewksbury || — || 23,571 || 93–65
|- bgcolor="ccffcc"
| 159 || September 30 || @ Cardinals || 2–0 || Drabek || Magrane || — || 32,672 || 94–65
|-

|- bgcolor="ffbbbb"
| 160 || October 1 || Mets || 1–4 || Cone || Smith || — || 50,393 || 94–66
|- bgcolor="ccffcc"
| 161 || October 2 || Mets || 9–4 || Landrum || Gooden || — || 50,028 || 95–66
|- bgcolor="ffbbbb"
| 162 || October 3 || Mets || 3–6 || Viola || York || Pena || 27,641 || 95–67
|-

|-
| Legend:       = Win       = Loss       = PostponementBold = Pirates team member

Record vs. opponents

Detailed records

Roster

Opening Day lineup

National League Championship Series

Awards and honors

Barry Bonds, OF, National League Most Valuable Player Award
Sid Bream, Hutch Award
Sid Bream, National League Record, Most Assists in One Season,
Doug Drabek, National League Cy Young Award
Doug Drabek, National League Pitcher of the Month, July
Doug Drabek, National League Pitcher of the Month, August
Jim Leyland, National League Manager of the Year Award
Andy Van Slyke, Outfield, Gold Glove Award

1990 Major League Baseball All-Star Game
Barry Bonds, OF, reserve
Bobby Bonilla, OF, reserve
Neal Heaton, P, reserve

Player stats
Batting
Note: G = Games played; AB = At bats; H = Hits; Avg. = Batting average; HR = Home runs; RBI = Runs batted in

Pitching
Note: G = Games pitched; IP = Innings pitched; W = Wins; L = Losses; ERA = Earned run average; SO = Strikeouts

Notable transactions
 May 2, 1990: Rico Rossy was traded by the Pirates to the Atlanta Braves for Greg Tubbs.
 May 18, 1990: Roger Mason was signed as a free agent with the Pittsburgh Pirates.
 June 5, 1990: The Pirates traded a player to be named later to the Baltimore Orioles for Jay Tibbs. The Pirates completed the deal by sending Dorn Taylor to the Orioles on September 5.
 August 8, 1990: Scott Ruskin, Willie Greene and a player to be named later were traded by the Pirates to the Montreal Expos for Zane Smith. The Pirates completed the trade by sending Moisés Alou to the Expos on August 16.
 September 1, 1990: Randy Kramer was traded by the Pirates to the Chicago Cubs for Greg Kallevig (minors).

Farm system

LEAGUE CHAMPIONS: DSL Pirates

References

 1990 Pittsburgh Pirates team at Baseball-Reference
 1990 Pittsburgh Pirates team page at www.baseball-almanac.com

Pittsburgh Pirates seasons
Pittsburgh Pirates season
National League East champion seasons
Pitts